Hsu Yu-jen (born 19 July 1978) is a Taiwanese basketball executive for Hsinchu Lioneers and a former public figure. Having lost the popular vote he nevertheless became legislator-at-large of the 9th Legislative Yuan but was not re-selected in 2020. He is also an entrepreneur and the cofounder of TEDxTaipei. Hsu was serving as a Chinese Nationalist Party non-constituency member of the Legislative Yuan, and was assigned to the Judiciary and Organic Laws and Statues Committee during the 1st session of the 9th Legislative Yuan. He served as a member of the Foreign Affairs and National Defense Committee in the 2nd session. He is an active advocate of issues regarding education, technology, innovation, sustainability, and marriage equality .

Early life and education
Hsu was born in 1978 in Kaohsiung, Taiwan. As a child, Hsu's parents ran food stalls in a night market. He graduated the National Chengchi University in 2000 with a B.A. in English. During this time, he also studied at Monash University in Melbourne, Australia as an exchange student. At 23, Hsu traveled across Central and South America, and is a fluent speaker of both English and Spanish. In 2013 Hsu won  the THNK School of Creative Leadership scholarship. In 2015 Hsu was invited  to enroll in the Singularity University Executive Program and completed the Exponential Technology course.

Career 

After returning from his exchange program to Monash, Hsu served for a year as an editor to the English-language newspaper, Taiwan News. With his savings from this time, he began traveling across South America, visiting Guatemala, Honduras, El Salvador, Panama, Costa Rica, and Peru. Hsu arrived first in Guatemala, where he stayed for six weeks and began lessons in Spanish. During this time, Hsu worked as a tutor of Chinese and took on farm work sorting coffee beans. Hsu was also employed as a tour guide while in Costa Rica. He finally returned to Taiwan after half a year in South American to fulfill his military enlistment. After his service, Hsu was asked by his college roommate, a member of the Mac software sales division (a predecessor to the Apple App Store), to help establish a startup company in San Francisco. Apple acquired the company a year and a half later and Hsu returned to Taiwan at the age of 27. After returning to Taiwan, Hsu worked as a corporate trainer for NIKE. In 2008, Hsu and his friend organized a diverse set of speakers to form "The Big Question Conference", a forerunner to TEDxTaipei.

Founding TEDx Taipei 
As partner to his college roommate's Mac software venture, Hsu developed a close working relationship with more than 6000 San Francisco based developers. Starting from 2008, Hsu began writing the TED headquarters in the United States to petition for the right to hold TED events in Taiwan. While he was not able to obtain TED authorization in 2008,
Hsu founded the Big Questions Inc., a consultancy focused on social innovation and future sustainability, at this time. Hsu then collaborated with a partner to launch a series of forum discussions known as "The Big Question Conference". In 2009, the TED organization released their conference licensing rights as part of the TEDx project. Hsu applied successfully for the right to host TEDx conferences and Taipei became the first city in Asia to obtain the license. At its founding, the TEDx Taipei team consisted of only three full-time and two part-time employees. With help from the Taiwan Cultural & Creative Foundation, the fledgling organization established its base of operations in the Huashan 1914 Creative Park. In 2011 Hsu became the TEDx ambassador for all of Asia, speaking at TED and TEDx conferences across the world including TEDx Summit, TEDx Kyoto, TEDx Itaewon, TEDx Wanchai and others. Hsu's stated goal at this time was to bring Taiwan's stories to the global stage. Hsu also organized the Sharable Cities Initiative in 2014, a series of hack-a-thons, forums, and workshops dedicated to increasing transparency and promoting open data through crowdsourcing.

Political career

Advisory Committee 
In the wake of the protests that erupted in March 2014 as part of the Sunflower Movement, Hsu became involved in public affairs in an effort to better represent Taiwan's students and young generation. He helped initiate the Advisory Committee of Innovation and Education and was invited to become a member by the Premier. As an advisor, Hsu offered policy suggestions to the Executive Yuan and participated government meetings. In 2016, he was elected by the Chinese Nationalist Party to serve as a non-constituency member of the Legislative Yuan.

Support of Marriage Equality 
Hsu was one of the few legislators in support of LGBT rights within the KMT. An adamant believer in amending the civil code, Hsu has voiced his resolute opposition to introducing special laws for the protection of LGBT rights. Hsu has stated that not amending the civil code would be an act of open discrimination to the LGBT community. As a legislator, Hsu believed that Taiwan should act as a leader for LGBT rights in Asia and become the first nation in the region to secure LGBT equality. Seeking bipartisan support, Hsu put forward a bill that would "make LGBT equality the pride of Taiwan". During the National Legislative Yuan Forum, Hsu expressed his concern for the difficulties facing the LGBT community in Taiwan, noting the historical lack protection under the law. Current legislation excludes same-sex partners from the right to marriage, adoption, and decision-making during medical emergencies. Hsu has stated, "It is as if, for the LGBT community, the law is nothing more than a useless piece of paper, the current legislation offers them very little protection". Working across party lines, Hsu has proposed to amend the provisions regarding family, inheritance, and other articles relating to the protection of LGBT rights within the Civil Code.

Sponsored and Cosponsored Legislation 
 Industry Innovation Regulations Act 
 Corporation Act 
 Banking Act 
 Employment Services Act 
 Commodities Tax Regulations Act 
 Sports Industry Development Regulations Act 
 Income Tax Act 
 Small Businesses Development Regulations Act 
 The Legislative Yuan Organization Act 
 The Family and Inheritance Civil Code Amendment

Congressional Diplomatic Association 
As former Legislative Yuan member, Hsu was part of:
 Republic of China-Switzerland Parliamentary Friendship Association ｜Chairman 
 Republic of China and Argentina, Brazil, Chile Parliamentary Friendship Association｜Chairman 
 Republic of China and Baltic States（Estonia, Latvia, Lithuania）Parliamentary Friendship Association｜Chairman

References

Party List Members of the Legislative Yuan
1978 births
Living people
Members of the 9th Legislative Yuan
Politicians of the Republic of China on Taiwan from Kaohsiung
Kuomintang Members of the Legislative Yuan in Taiwan